The D.I.C.E. Award for Racing Game of the Year is an award presented annually by the Academy of Interactive Arts & Sciences during the academy's annual D.I.C.E. Awards. This recognizes "titles that allow the user to participate in a contest in which the objective is to convey an object through a course of virtual physical progress as quickly as possible. Racing games may involve competition against other user-controlled competitors or against system controlled competitors. Racing games must simulate vehicular motion." It was originally presented as Console Racing Game of the Year, with its first winner being Diddy Kong Racing which was developed by Rare and published by Nintendo. It was simplified to Racing Game of the Year in 2005. 

The award's most recent winner is Gran Turismo 7 developed by Polyphony Digital and was published by Sony Interactive Entertainment.

Winners and nominees

1990s

2000s

2010s

2020s

Multiple nominations and wins

Developers and publishers 
Codemasters has the most nominations as a developer, but has never actually won. Criterion Games has the won the most racing game awards. Electronic Arts has the most nominations and has won the most awards, as a publisher. EA Black Box is the only developer with back-to-back wins for Need for Speed: Hot Pursuit 2 in 2003 and Need for Speed: Underground in 2004. Nintendo and Microsoft Studios also have back-to-back wins as publishers. Microsoft Studios won with Forza Motorsport 6 in 2016 and Forza Horizon 3 in 2017. Nintendo won with Mario Kart Tour in 2020 and Mario Kart Live: Home Circuit in 2021.

Franchises 
The three most nominated and award-winning franchises, Forza, Need for Speed, and Mario Kart, have all had back-to-back wins for Racing Game of the Year:
 Need for Speed: Need for Speed: Hot Pursuit 2 (2003) and Need for Speed: Underground (2004).
 Forza: Forza Motorsport 6 (2016) and Forza Horizon 3 (2017).
 Mario Kart: Mario Kart Tour (2020) and Mario Kart Live: Home Circuit (2021).

Notes

References 

D.I.C.E. Awards
Awards established in 1998
Awards for best video game